Nilay Karaağaç (born 24 October 1985 in Salihli, Manisa Province, Turkey), formerly aka Nilay Benli, is a Turkish volleyball player. She plays for Galatasaray and wears jersey number 11. She played 74 times for the Turkey women's national volleyball team.

Career
Özdemir played with Fenerbahçe in the 2012 FIVB Club World Championship held in Doha, Qatar and helped her team to win the bronze medal after defeating Puerto Rico's Lancheras de Cataño 3-0.

Clubs
 2000-2004 Karşıyaka
 2005-2007 Emlak TOKİ
 2007-2008 Türk Telekom Ankara
 2008-2010 Beşiktaş JK
 2010-2012 Vakifbank Türk Telekom
 2012-2014 Fenerbahçe
 2014-2015 Eczacıbaşı VitrA
 2015 Volero Zurich
 2015-2016 Eczacıbaşı VitrA
 2017-2018 Bursa Büyükşehir Belediyespor
 2019-2022 Galatasaray

Awards

Clubs
 2012 FIVB Women's Club World Championship –  Bronze Medal, with Fenerbahçe
 2012-13 CEV Cup -  Silver Medal, with Fenerbahçe
 2013-14 CEV Cup -  Champion, with Fenerbahçe

National Team
2011 European Championship - 
 2012 FIVB World Grand Prix -

See also
 Turkish women in sports

References

External links
Player profile at Galatasaray.org

1985 births
Sportspeople from Manisa
Living people
Turkish women's volleyball players
Fenerbahçe volleyballers
Beşiktaş volleyballers
VakıfBank S.K. volleyballers
Eczacıbaşı volleyball players
Karşıyaka volleyballers
Türk Telekom volleyballers
Galatasaray S.K. (women's volleyball) players